The Kakisa River is a major tributary of the Mackenzie River in the Northwest Territories of Canada.

The river gives the name to the Kakisa Formation, a stratigraphical unit of the Western Canadian Sedimentary Basin.

Course
It flows westwards, briefly crossing into the Northwest Territories, then back into Alberta.  east of the British Columbia border it turns north and flows back in the Northwest Territories. It keeps a north to northeast direction, paralleling the Redknife River  for a while, then turns east, where it builds a complex lake and channel system before it empties into the Tathlina Lake at its western extremity. It flows out the north side of the lake and continues north, receives the waters of Gull Creek, then flows into the Kakisa Lake at its southern shore. It flows out at the eastern side of the lake, drops through the Lady Evelyn Falls before it is crossed by the Mackenzie Highway.

Tributaries
Tathlina Lake
Gull Creek
Kakisa Lake

See also 
 List of rivers of Alberta
List of rivers of the Northwest Territories

Rivers of the Northwest Territories
Rivers of Alberta
Tributaries of the Mackenzie River